Tuscarora  (Shoshoni language: Tosa Konoki) is an unincorporated community in Elko County, Nevada, United States. The community lies on the east side of the Tuscarora Mountains approximately 40 miles north of Carlin.  Tuscarora is part of the Elko Micropolitan Statistical Area.  Far from being a ghost town, as several websites proclaim, Tuscarora is home to two schools, a library, a post office and a bar and grill, as well as homes for its very much alive residents.

History
Tuscarora was founded in Elko County after an expedition by trader William Heath to find gold, in 1867. The community derives its name from the Tuscarora people. As miners flocked to the town, a fort was built to offer protection from Indian raids and a water ditch was created to supply the town with water. Many Chinese men who had been employed by the Central Pacific Railroad (CPR) relocated to the town and began placer mining. By 1870, Tuscarora had a population of 119, of whom 104 were Chinese. A post office was established at Tuscarora in 1871. A boom began following the discovery of silver ore. In 1879, the population of Tuscarora reached 1,500, making it one of the larger settlements in entire Nevada.

A second mining boom occurred between 1883 to 1887, racking up an equally high amount of silver as it did during its first boom as a result of several newly built mines in the 1870s. However, the silver production generated in the mines established during this mining boom period did not yield the same amount of production as they had previously, and mining companies in Tuscarora started entering into a decline period, with several mines, such as the Young America mine, closing down in the early 1890s.

Despite this, several mining companies continued operating, and at one point, gold production was higher than silver during the late 1890s and early 1900s. In 1987, exploration for microscopic gold mining was initiated, resulting in Horizon Gold establishing a permanent mine for silver and gold extraction in 1989, which lasted until 1991.

Education
Tuscarora is home to two small schools provided by the Elko County School District.

Tuscarora has a public library, a branch of the Elko-Lander-Eureka County Library System.

Notable people
 Wheezer Dell, He was the first Nevada-born player in Major League Baseball History.

References

External links

 Elko County website
 Tuscarora Branch Library

Unincorporated communities in Elko County, Nevada
Unincorporated communities in Nevada
Elko, Nevada micropolitan area